The Commission Against Corruption (CCAC,) is an official body of Macau responsible for the prevention, investigation and (probably) prosecution of corrupt activities.

History
The High Commission Against Corruption and Administrative Illegality (ACCCIA) was created by the Portuguese Macau government in 1992 to replace some of the anti-corruption duties conducted by Macau Judicial Police forces under Law No. 11/90/M. There was some early attempt to establish an agency since 1975, but no progress was made under the direction of former Macau Governor Raul Leandrodos Santos. This was followed by deliberations to establish an "Anti-Corruption Committee" in 1983.

The ACCCIA's operations throughout Portuguese Macau was badly affected by its weak mandate. This was because there was no agreement with the governor and the Legislative Assembly of Macau on what powers it has to conduct anti-corruption investigation.

On December 20, 1999, the CCAC was established by the Macau SAR government in accordance to the SAR's Basic Law under Article 59.

In 2005, the CCAC started an investigation into Ao Man-long, then the Secretary of Public Works and Transport, for being involved in money laundering after ICAC officers informed them that the money laundering case they were investigating likely involved him, which was followed by an arrest on December 6, 2006. Ao was then removed from his post on December 7, 2006.

On January 4, 2011, Chan Seak Hou and Tou Wai Fong resigned from their position as deputy commissioners and were reassigned to the Public Prosecutions Office. On January 1, 2011, Kuan Kun Hong was appointed as the CCAC's deputy commissioner.

In November 2013, the CCAC releases an investigation and analysis report on complaints regarding the Granting of Public Service of Road Mass Transport. The original complaint was received on May 30, 2013, and due to the filing of bankruptcy of Reolian on October 3, 2013, the CCAC released their findings. As one of the results of the report, lawmakers in Macau suggested Secretary for Transport and Public Works, Lau Si Io, to resign.

Duties
Per Law No. 10/2000 of 14 August, the CCAC carries the following major statutory duties:

 To carry out preventive actions against acts of corruption or fraud.
 To investigate any crimes of corruption and fraud committed by civil servants.
 To investigate allegation of corruption and fraud in electoral registration and election of members of the institutions in the Macau SAR.
 To protect human rights, freedom and legitimate interests of individuals, as well as to uphold fairness, lawfulness and efficiency of the public administration.

Officials

The following were appointed to head the CCAC (and its predecessor, the ACCCIA):

High Commissioner Against Corruption and Administrative Illegality
HCACAI was appointed by the Governor of Macau.

 Jorge Alberto Aragao Seia 1991-1995
 Luis Manuel Guerreiro de Mendonca Freitas 1995-1999

Commissioners Against Corruption of Macau
The head of the CCAC is appointed by the Chief Executive of Macau.

 Cheong U 1999-2009
 Vasco Fong Man Chong 2009-2014
 André Cheong Weng Chon 2014–2019
 Chan Tsz King 2019–present

Deputy Commissioners Against Corruption of Macau
 Kuan Kun Hong January 2011 – present

See also 
 ICAC, a similar agency in Hong Kong and the model for Macau

References

External links 
 CCAC Website

Law enforcement agencies of Macau
Anti-corruption agencies
Commissioner Against Corruption
1990 establishments in Macau
Corruption in Macau